Route 201 can refer to:

International
 European route E201

Australia 

  - South Australia

Canada
 Alberta Highway 201 
 Manitoba Provincial Road 201
 Newfoundland and Labrador Route 201
 Nova Scotia Route 201
 Prince Edward Island Route 201
 Quebec Route 201
 Saskatchewan Highway 201

China
 China National Highway 201

Costa Rica
 National Route 201

India
  National Highway 201 (India)

Japan
 Japan National Route 201

Malaysia 
  Malaysia Federal Route 201

United States
 Interstate H-201
 U.S. Route 201
 Alabama State Route 201
 Arkansas Highway 201
 Arkansas Highway 201 Spur
 California State Route 201
 Connecticut Route 201
 Florida State Road 201 (former)
 Georgia State Route 201
Hawaii Route 201 (future)
 Indiana State Road 201
 K-201 (Kansas highway)
 Maryland Route 201
 M-201 (Michigan highway)
 Minnesota State Highway 201 (former)
 Montana Secondary Highway 201
 New Jersey Route 201 (former)
 New York State Route 201
 Ohio State Route 201
 Oregon Route 201
 Pennsylvania Route 201
 South Carolina Highway 201
 Tennessee State Route 201 
 Texas State Highway 201
 Utah State Route 201
 Virginia State Route 201
Territories
 Puerto Rico Highway 201